Doomsday Clock is a superhero comic book limited series published by DC Comics, created by Geoff Johns, Gary Frank and Brad Anderson. As a direct sequel to the graphic novel Watchmen by Alan Moore, Dave Gibbons and John Higgins, this series concluded the plot established between The New 52 and DC Rebirth, featuring a massive roster of characters owned by DC Comics.

The following is a list of characters who have appeared.

Watchmen universe

Crimebusters
The Crimebusters is a superhero group that succeeds the Minutemen. The group was short-lived when the Keene Act that forbade non-government sanctioned superheroes was passed.

Among its notable members are:

 Comedian / Edward Blake — A former member of the Minutemen and the Crimebusters whose death was prevented by Doctor Manhattan. He then began his revenge crusade against Ozymandias for attempting to kill him, as well as continuing on the trail of Mime and Marionette. Comedian catches up to Joker, Mime, and Marionette when they attend an underground villain meeting held by Riddler to discuss the Superman Theory. He makes himself known by shooting Typhoon in the face. While pursuing them, he evades Giganta's attacks, shoots Riddler in the leg, and uses a grenade to defeat the other villains present. When Mime and Marionette are in bed together the next morning, Comedian catches up to them where he plans to use them to find Ozymandias. Before Comedian can do anything, Joker comes to Mime and Marionette's rescue and stuns Comedian with a joy buzzer. As Batman gets free and fights Joker, Mime and Marionette escape with Comedian and the Lantern Battery. After non-fatally shooting Oyzmandias, Comedian is returned to his spot in time.
 Doctor Manhattan / Jonathan Osterman — A former member of the Crimebusters who remains skeptical of humanity's hope. He is suspected for altering the DC Universe following the Flashpoint event, and for making "experiments" in the lives of Superman and everyone else. When he was summoned by Ozymandias through Bubastis II, Manhattan reveals about Ozymandias's false cancer, and why he spared the Mime and Marionette's firstborn child. After Firestorm's incident, Manhattan was confronted by most of Earth's heroes, but he defeated them all. Before arriving on Earth to confront Superman, Manhattan spares the defeated heroes on Mars, but makes sure they don't interfere. After Superman stops Pozhar from attacking him, Doctor Manhattan has a chat with Superman before undoing the effects that erased the Justice Society of America and the Legion of Super-Heroes.
 Nite Owl II / Daniel Dreiberg — Former member of the Crimebusters, who has a current relationship with Laurel Juspeczyk. They would conceive a daughter and adopt Mime and Marionette's son. Dan and Laurel are confirmed to have adopted Mime and Marionette's son who addressed himself as Clark.
 Ozymandias / Adrian Veidt — A former member of the Crimebusters who becomes a fugitive after the truth behind his alien monster's attack is exposed when Walter's journal was published. Having purportedly been diagnosed with terminal brain cancer, and knowing that his plan to save the world has failed, Veidt recruits Reggie Long as the new Rorschach and has him break Erika Manson and her husband Marcos Maez out of prison. When Rorschach II returns with the two, Veidt reveals himself and his situation, explaining to the two criminals that they must follow Manhattan to another universe and convince him to save their world. Using the Owlship, Veidt and his group travel to the DC Universe just as nuclear war breaks out on their Earth. After conducting research on this new world he's found himself in, Veidt goes to Metropolis to ask Lex Luthor to join his quest. However, as he is pleading his case, Veidt is shocked to find himself being confronted by the Comedian, who has been transported to the DC Universe by Manhattan. Comedian turns out to be evenly matched with Veidt, forcing him to retreat through Luthor's office window. Veidt falls twenty stories and is hospitalized with minor injuries, but soon manages to escape. Upon returning to the Owlship, Veidt is confronted by Batman, who has read the contents of the original Rorschach's journal. As the two elude the police, Batman asserts that Veidt murdered millions as part of a delusional hero syndrome, and accuses him of concocting a conspiracy theory that has negatively affected the public's trust in the superheroes of the DC Universe. Veidt in turn criticizes Batman for focusing all his attention on chasing supervillains while ignoring the world's social problems. A struggle ensues, leading to Batman falling out of the Owlship and into a mob of anti-hero protestors below. Using his pet lynx, Bubastis II, and Alan Scott's Green Lantern Power Battery, Veidt teleports Doctor Manhattan to the Joker's lair, where Batman is fighting Marionette and Mime. Manhattan refuses to return to their world since he's in the middle of experimenting with this one. Manhattan reveals, among other things, that Veidt lied to Rorschach II about having cancer in order to get his help. Rorschach II punches Veidt and flees, while Veidt returns to the Owlship, attacks Imra and Johnny, and declares he can save everyone. He breaks into the Oval Office at the White House and checks the file of Firestorm. He then watches the event involving Superman and Firestorm in Russia from an undisclosed location with what appears to be a military outfit lying behind him, with Imra and Johnny being held captive. After claiming that he arranged for Superman to convince Doctor Manhattan to save the world, Ozymandias is non-fatally shot by Comedian. When returned to his world, Ozymandias is last seen standing trial.
 Rorschach I / Walter Kovacs — Former member of the Crimebusters, who was killed by Doctor Manhattan seven years ago. However, his journal was published over time by Robert Redford and the New Frontiersman, exposing Ozymandias' role in the New York massacre. According to Ozymandias, Walter had broken down Malcolm Long's positive attitude during his time in jail.
 Silk Spectre II / Laurel Juspeczyk — Former member of the Crimebusters and daughter of Edward Blake and Sally Jupiter. She would conceive a daughter with Nite Owl II and adopt Mime and Marionette's son. She refused to join Ozymandias on his search to find Doctor Manhattan.

Minutemen
The Minutemen are a superhero group that came before the Crimebusters. The group was founded in 1939 during the Golden Age. The group later disbanded in 1949 following some public controversies.

Among its notable members are:

 Captain Metropolis / Nelson Gardner — Founding member of the Minutemen who would later found the Crimebusters. He was found decapitated in a road accident.
 Dollar Bill / William Brady — Former member of the Minutemen who died trying to stop a bank robbery just because his cape that the bank he works for made for him got caught in the revolving door.
 Hooded Justice - Former member of the Minutemen who had a relationship with Captain Metropolis. He was murdered by Nite Owl I after the Comedian framed him for a series of child killings caused by serial killer Rolf Müller.
 Mothman / Byron Lewis — Former member of the Minutemen. Rorschach II met him in an asylum following the attack of Ozymandias' alien monster, and learned some fighting moves from him. Byron later commits suicide by being attracted to the fires of the burning asylum. He used to hide the pages in Dr. Long's journal that show his mental breakdown during his time with Rorschach I.
 Nite Owl I / Hollis Mason — Former member of the Minutemen who died fighting the thugs that attacked his home.
 Silhouette / Ursula Zand — Former member of the Minutemen who was killed by the Liquidator.
 Silk Spectre I / Sally Jupiter — Former member of the Minutemen, who still loved Edward Blake in spite of his past cruelties, giving birth to their daughter Laurel. She was mentioned to have passed away.

New Frontiersman
The New Frontiersman is a newspaper that published Rorschach's journal, exposing Ozymandias' role in the New York Massacre.

 Seymour David — A junior worker at the New Frontiersman magazine offices. It was revealed that he was “brutally beaten to death” after the publication of Walter's journal.

Ozymandias' team
 Bubastis I — A genetically-altered lynx that was the former pet of Ozymandias.
 Bubastis II — A genetically-altered lynx that is the current pet of Ozymandias and the successor of the original Bubastis. It was later revealed to have been cloned from the original Bubastis as it had some of the energy needed to track Doctor Manhattan. She later uses that same energy to cause an explosion on Russia around Firestorm and Superman to frame Manhattan.
 Mime / Marcos Maez and Marionette / Erika Manson — A criminal husband-and-wife team. Based on the Casey and Andy character of the same name by Andy Weir, Mime is a mime artist-themed villain who wields invisible weapons while Marionette wields wires. Erika grew up around her father's marionette shop, where she befriended the mute Marcos. When her father hung himself after being threatened by crooked cops, she and Marcos badly beat up the cops and pursued a life of crime. She was sent to the orphanage in Grand Forks, North Dakota. they later married and had a child. They were imprisoned for theft and murder until Rorschach II freed them on Ozymandias' behalf. Ozymandias offers Marionette and Mime an opportunity to find their son if they help him find Doctor Manhattan. Arriving in the DC Universe via one of Nite Owl's old owlships, Mime and Marionette wander the streets of Gotham City, eventually entering Joker's territory. After killing Joker's henchmen in an altercation at a bar, they decide to find the villain. They finally meet Joker at the top of the Gotham City Police Department as one of Joker's henchmen brings the defeated body of Batman to him. The pair accompanies Joker to Riddler's underground villain meeting, which is crashed by the Comedian. The Comedian catches up to Mime and Marionette, but Joker uses his joy buzzer on the Comedian to save them. Joker admits that he has taken a liking to Mime and Marionette. On Joker's funhouse, Manhattan reveals why he spared them, besides they expect a second child. Mime and Marionette then escape with Comedian and the Lantern Battery. After Manhattan restored the DC Universe, he asks Mime and Marionette to stay, hoping to give them a second chance in raising their daughter Anita, and also because he already planned to reunite them with their other son Clark.
 Nostalgia / Cleopatra Pak — An orphan girl residing outside of Veidt's imprisonment who takes in Bubastis II.
 Rorschach II / Reggie Long — The son of Malcolm and Gloria Long, who becomes Walter Kovacs's successor as the new Rorschach. Ozymandias then recruits him as his new employee in his quest to find Doctor Manhattan where their search for him takes them to the DC Universe. When his parents died during the New York massacre, Reggie was traumatized by the event, and put into a psychiatric institution, where Mothman taught him how to fight and defend himself. Reginald then reads Kovacs' journal and learns that Adrian Veidt caused the massacre. After escaping the institution, Reggie became Rorschach II and initially planned to kill Ozymandias out of revenge. However, Reggie decided to spare Adrian after the latter claimed he had terminal cancer. Ozymandias then recruits Reginald as his new employee in his quest to find Doctor Manhattan; their search for him takes them to the DC universe. After meeting Batman, who locks him up on Arkham Asylum, Reggie is protected by Zebra-Man, and later rescued by Saturn Girl. The two of them escape Arkham to save John Thunder from a gang of thugs. When everyone is reunited in Joker's fun house, Batman reconciles with Reggie. When Doctor Manhattan appears and reveals Adrian was lying about his cancer, Reggie hits Adrian in retaliation for lying to him. He then takes off his mask and declares "Rorschach is dead" before leaving, with Batman trying to follow him, to no avail. Reggie was later seen holding a sign as the riots occur. After some persuasion from Batman and Alfred, Reggie becomes Rorschach again. He continues to operate as Rorschach when returned to his world.
 The Squid — The "alien monster" summoned by Ozymandias that caused the New York massacre. Rorschach II had nightmares about it.

Other characters
 Anita Maez — The as-yet unborn daughter of Mime and Marionette.
 Gloria Long — Wife of Malcolm Long and mother of Rorschach II, who died in the New York massacre caused by Ozymandias' alien monster.
 Janey Slater — Ex-girlfriend of Doctor Manhattan, whom she blamed for her terminal cancer, unaware that Ozymandias was truly responsible. After Doctor Manhattan got rid of the nuclear weapons and rewrote his history, Jon is now married to Janey.
 Josef Osterman — The son of Jon Osterman and Janey Slater in a rewritten timeline..
 Malcolm Long — Father of Reggie and former therapist of Walter. He died in the New York massacre caused by Ozymandias' alien monster.
 Sally Hollis — Daughter of Night Owl II and Silk Spectre II.
 Watchman (Clark Maez-Driberg) — The firstborn son of Mime and Marionette. He was taken from his mother shortly after birth and raised in secret on Mars by Doctor Manhattan. After several years, he is left by Manhattan on the doorstep of Dan Drieberg and Laurie Juspeczyk to be raised by them. Having been given Manhattan's powers, it is implied Manhattan intends Clark to be that Earth's version of Superman.

DC Universe

The DC Universe is where most of DC's mainline comics take place. As this reality acts as a "Metaverse", it also affects both the Multiverse and Dark Multiverse linked to it.

Amazons

 Wonder Woman / Diana of Themyscira / Diana Prince — The demigoddess daughter of Zeus and Princess of Themyscira and Member of the Justice League. Doctor Poison mentioned the rumor that she was forcefully dragged by the Amazons back to Themyscira. She comes out of hiding to address the United Nations about the Metahuman Arms Race, only to be interrupted by Black Adam, Creeper, and Giganta. Due to a vision by the oracle, the Amazons crashed Wonder Woman's battle with Black Adam and took her back to Themyscira.
 Hippolyta — The Queen of the Amazons in Themyscira and mother of Wonder Woman. She arranges for Wonder Woman to be brought back to Themyscira after the Oracle foretold that Wonder Woman will be severely injured if her fight with Black Adam continues.

Arkham Asylum

Arkham Asylum is a psychiatric hospital where most of Batman's enemies are locked up. It's known inmates are:

 Maximilian Zeus — An inmate inside Arkham Asylum.
 Professor Achilles Milo — An inmate inside Arkham Asylum.
 Victor Zsasz — An inmate inside Arkham Asylum.
 Vortex — An inmate inside Arkham Asylum who protects Rorschach II.

Atlanteans
 Aquaman / Arthur Curry — Member of the Justice League and King of Atlantis.
 Aqualad / Kaldur'ahm / Jackson Hyde
 Mera — Member of the Justice League and Queen of Atlantis.

Batman's team
Batman and his allies from Gotham City. The following characters are in this category:

 Batman / Bruce Wayne — Gotham City's superhero who tries to bond with Rorschach II and discover his connection to Ozymandias and Doctor Manhattan and Member of the Justice League. He once locked him up inside Arkham Asylum to interrogate him under the disguise of a psychiatrist named "Matthew Mason" to verify his claims. After discovering everything that Rorschach II said was true, he apologizes to him. Batman and Alfred later persuade Reggie to operate as Rorschach again.
 Alfred Pennyworth — Batman's butler who tries to bond with Rorschach II. He even suggested Batman that locking him up on Arkham was a bad idea.
 Batgirl / Barbara Gordon — The daughter of James Gordon.
 Batwoman / Kate Kane — The cousin of Batman.
 James Gordon — The police commissioner of the Gotham City Police Department.
 Lucius Fox — An employee of Wayne Enterprises who tries to convince Batman to cease his vigilante activities before LexCorp buys the company.
 Nightwing / Dick Grayson — The first Robin and former member of the Flying Graysons.
 Red Hood / Jason Todd — The second Robin.

Big Monster Action
Big Monster Action is an expanded version of Big Science Action which is Japan's sanctioned superhero team. Among its identified members are:

 Rising Sun - Leader of Big Monster Action.
 Goraiko - A psionic construct and member of Big Monster Action.
 Hammersuit Zero-X - A member of Big Monster Action who wears a powered exoskeleton.
 Judomaster - A martial artist member of Big Monster Action.
 Naiad - An aquakinetic member of Big Monster Action.
 Ram - A computer-manipulating member of Big Monster Action.
 Samurai - A wind-manipulating member of Big Monster Action.

Black Adam's team
Black Adam and his allies from Kahndaq who are made up of those who gained asylum for the rejected metahumans around the world.

 Black Adam / Teth-Adam — Shazam's nemesis and ruler of Kahndaq, who offers to bring asylum to every rejected metahuman around the world. He has been aware of the United States' government being involved in the Superman Theory. After gaining other allies, Black Adam led the attack on the White House when he is briefly confronted by Superman. He then led his group into getting to Superman while competing against the People's Heroes, the Outsiders, and the Doomed. When Doctor Manhattan undid the experiment that erased the Justice Society of America and the Legion of Super-Heroes, Black Adam was defeated by Johnny Thunderbolt.
 Creeper / Jack Ryder — He gains asylum in Kahndaq after being rescued by Black Adam from the Kobra organization. He accompanied Black Adam in his attack on the United Nations. Then he joined him in his attack on the White House.
 Doc Dread / Bob Fradon — Former childhood friend of Metamorpho. He joined Black Adam in his attack on the White House.
 Giganta / Doris Zeul — She gains asylum in Kahndaq after the League of Villany's meeting was crashed by the Comedian. Giganta later accompanied Black Adam in his attack on the United Nations. After a fight with Wonder Woman, she joins Black Adam in his attack on the White House.
 Killer Frost / Louise Lincoln — A former supervillainess who accuses Firestorm of being a government agent. She later joins Black Adam on invading the White House.
 Lady Clayface / Sondra Fuller — A former member of the cult of Kobra. Lady Clayface claimed that Kobra wasn't responsible for her shapeshifting powers and that the government was. She later joined Black Adam in his attack on the White House.
 Man-Bat / Kirk Langstrom — One of the people who expose the Superman Theory. He later accompanied Black Adam in his attack on the White House.
 Manhunter / Leviathan / Mark Shaw — The current leader of the Leviathan organization after he overthrowed Talia al Ghul. He joins Black Adam on invading the White House.
 Sandstorm / Nabil Azmah — Sandstorm is a sand-controlling vigilante. He joins Black Adam on invading the White House.
 Stingaree / Samuel Reese — Former lover of Element Girl who was presumed dead, but later resurfaces as part of Black Adam's army.

Court of Owls

The Court of Owls are associates of the League of Villainy. Representatives of the group attended their meeting.

 Judge of Owls — He states that the Court of Owls is not relocating to Kahndaq.

Daily Planet

The Daily Planet is Metropolis' official newspaper. The following characters work for the Daily Planet:

 Perry White — Chief of the Daily Planet.
 Catherine Grant — A journalist of the Daily Planet.
 Jackee Winters — A journalist of the Daily Planet.
 James Olsen — A journalist of the Daily Planet.
 Ronald Troupe — A journalist of the Daily Planet.
 Steven Lombard — A journalist of the Daily Planet.

Department of Metahuman Affairs
The Department of Metahuman Affairs (DMA) is a government agency established by Martin Stein that created its own metahumans in the United States. Among those involved are:

 Martin Stein — Ronald Raymond's partner as Firestorm and former member of the Justice League, who was revealed by Doctor Manhattan to be the Director of the DMA and the one responsible behind the Supermen Theory. He sustained that he founded the agency to help other metahumans like his son who died because he couldn't control his metagene. After Doctor Manhattan undoes the experiment that erased the Justice Society of America and the Legion of Super-Heroes, Martin Stein was arrested for his involvement with the Department of Metahuman Affairs.
 Firestorm / Ronald Raymond — A superhero partnered with Martin Stein, unaware he was being used by the DMA. When Killer Frost claimed that Firestorm is a government agent, he denied any knowledge of it. His powers are later manipulated by Doctor Manhattan, turning Russian citizens into glass statues, with Bubastis II causing an explosion around him. When Ronald confronted Doctor Manhattan, the latter revealed that Stein orchestrated their transformation at purpose. Following Martin Stein's arrest, Ronald undergoes treatment at the All-Star Clinic which is Doctor Mid-Nite's medical clinic.
 Elasti-Girl / Rita Farr — Former actress and former member of the Doom Patrol. She was later seen with the Doom Patrol when they go to confront Doctor Manhattan on Mars.
 Element Girl / Urania Blackwell — A former spy whose powers were unstable, causing her to commit suicide.
 Helga Jace — A Markovian scientist who exposes the Supermen Theory.
 Hyena / Summer Day — Hyena was mentioned to have been the product of the Department of Metahuman affairs as a news report mentions her alongside Firestorm and Killer Frost.
 Moonbow / Brittany Brandon — An agent of the DMA who infiltrated inside the League of Villainy and was later confirmed to be associated with them.
 Typhoon / David Drake — An agent of the Department of Metahuman Affairs who infiltrated inside the League of Villainy before being shot and killed by the Comedian. Typhoon's involvement with the DMA was confirmed after his death as Stein gives orders to retrieve his body.

Doom Patrol

Members of the Doom Patrol are among the superheroes that confront Doctor Manhattan on Mars. They consist of:

 Chief / Niles Caulder — Leader of the Doom Patrol.
 Crazy Jane / Kay Challis — Member of the Doom Patrol.
 Negative Man / Larry Trainor — Member of the Doom Patrol.
 Robotman / Cliff Steele — Member of the Doom Patrol.
 Elasti-Girl / Rita Farr - Member of the Doom Patrol.
 Flex Mentallo — Ally of the Doom Patrol.

Doomed
The Doomed are India's sanctioned superhero team. Among its identified members are:

 Celsius / Arani Desai — Former member of the Doom Patrol and leader of the Doomed.
 Aalok of the Komeriah — Member of the Doomed.
 Animal-Vegetable-Mineral Man — A member of the Doomed who can become an animal, a vegetable, a mineral, or a hybrid of all three.
 Aruna — Member of the Doomed.
 Beast Girl — Member of the Doomed.
 Maya — Member of the Doomed.
 Solstice — Member of the Doomed.
 Son of Kalki — Member of the Doomed.

Elite Basu
The Elite Basu is Iran's sanctioned superhero team. Among its identified members are:

 Seyeh the Seer — Leader of the Elite Basu.
 Blacksmith of Tehran — Member of the Elite Basu.
 Manticore — A genetically-altered humanoid manticore and member of the Elite Basu.
 Patient One — Member of the Elite Basu.
 Scirocco / Khalid — Member of the Elite Basu.
 Super-Shayk — Member of the Elite Basu.

Great Twenty
The Great Twenty is an expanded version of the Great Ten that is China's sanctioned superhero team. Among its identified members are:

 Super-Man / Kong Kenan — Leader of the Great Twenty and China's version of Superman who has the life energy of a dead Kryptonian.
 Accomplished Perfect Physician — A magic-using member of the Great Twenty.
 August General in Iron — A member of the Great Twenty who has super-strength and can grow iron plates on his body.
 Bat-Man / Wang Baixi — A member of the Great Twenty and China's version of Batman.
 Celestial Archer — An archery member of the Great Twenty.
 Dao — Member of the Great Twenty.
 Flash / Avery Ho — A member of the Great Twenty and China's version of Flash.
 Ghost Fox Killer — A ghost-controlling member of the Great Twenty.
 Gloss — Member of the Great Twenty.
 Guanxi — Member of the Great Twenty.
 Immortal Man-in-Darkness — A member of the Great Twenty who pilots the Dragonwing aircraft.
 Mother of Champions — A member of the Great Twenty who can give birth to 25 genetically-altered supersoldiers every 3 days.
 Night-Dragon — Member of the Great Twenty.
 Ri — Member of the Great Twenty.
 Seven Deadly Brothers — A member of the Great Twenty who can split into seven clones.
 Shaolin Robot — An automaton who is a member of the Great Twenty.
 Socialist Red Guardsman — An armored member of the Great Twenty with solar radiation abilities.
 Striker Z — Member of the Great Twenty.
 Thundermind — A telepathic member of the Great Twenty.
 Wonder-Woman / Peng Deilan — A member of the Great Twenty and China's counterpart of Wonder Woman.

Green Lantern Corps

The Green Lantern Corps are a group of intergalactic law enforcers who wield the green power ring. They alongside Firestorm were able to provide Mars with oxygen in order to confront Doctor Manhattan. Among its featured members are:

 Hal Jordan — A Green Lantern who was chosen by Abin Sur and member of the Justice League.
 Guy Gardner — Member of the Green Lantern Corps. He led the superheroes into attacking Doctor Manhattan. Guy's ring got analyzed and dissected by Doctor Manhattan and member of the Justice League.
 John Stewart — Member of the Green Lantern Corps and member of the Justice league.
 Jessica Cruz — Member of the Green Lantern Corps and the Justice League Odyssey.

Hayoth
The Hayoth is Israel's sanctioned superhero team. Among its identified members are:

 Seraph / Chaim Levon — Leader of the Hayoth.
 Dybbuk — An A.I. who is a member of the Hayoth.
 Golem — A member of the Hayoth who has a clay-like body.
 Judith — A martial artist and swordswoman member of the Hayoth.
 Pteradon — A Pteranodon-themed member of the Hayoth.
 Ramban — A magician and member of the Hayoth.

Justice League

The Justice League is a superhero group that Superman, Wonder Woman, and Batman are a part of. Some of its members were among the superheroes that confronted Doctor Manhattan on Mars. Among its identified members are:

 Black Canary / Dinah Lance — Member of the Justice League.
 Cyborg / Victor Stone — Member of the Justice League.
 Green Arrow / Oliver Queen — Member of the Justice League and Star City's superhero.
 Hawkgirl / Kendra Saunders — Member of the Justice League.
 Martian Manhunter / J'onn J'onzz — Member of the Justice League. He suggested reasoning with Doctor Manhattan only for the superheroes to fight him instead after they see Martian Manhunter's mental broadcast of Doctor Manhattan's future encounter with Superman.
 Vixen / Mari McCabe — She is among the superheroes that confronted Doctor Manhattan on Mars.

Justice League Dark

The Justice League Dark is an occult branch of the Justice League. They are among the superheroes that confront Doctor Manhattan on Mars. Doctor Manhattan's analysis states that their magic is from the "scraps of Creation." Among its identified members are:

 John Constantine — Leader of the Justice League Dark.
 Deadman — Member of the Justice League Dark.
 Etrigan the Demon / Jason Blood — Member of the Justice League Dark.
 Swamp Thing / Alec Holland — Member of the Justice League Dark.
 Zatanna Zatara — Member of the Justice League Dark.

Justice League Europe

Justice League Europe is France's sanctioned superhero team. Among its identified members are:

 Crimson Fox — Leader of the Justice League Europe.
 Fleur-de-Lis — Member of the Justice League Europe.
 Hunchback — Member of the Justice League Europe.
 Musketeer — Member of the Justice League Europe.
 Nightrunner — Member of the Justice League Europe.
 Thief of Arts — Member of the Justice League Europe.

Justice Society of America

The Justice Society of America is a team of superheroes from the Pre-Flashpoint era that existed since the 1940s. Lois Lane later finds a flash-drive that talks about them. Lois didn't know about the Justice Society until now. It was revealed that Lex Luthor was the one who discovered the drive and sent it to Lois Lane. When Doctor Manhattan undid the experiment that erased the Justice Society of America and Legion of Super-Heroes, the Justice Society of America appeared to help Superman fight the rampaging metahumans.

Among its identified members are:

 Green Lantern / Alan Scott — Founder  of the Justice Society of America, whose fate was altered by Doctor Manhattan resulting on his death when Doctor Manhattan moved the lantern inches from his reach. This was later undone by Doctor Manhattan as he and the Justice Society of America assist in fighting Black Adam's group and the foreign superheroes.
 Atom Smasher / Albert Rothstein — A size-shifting superhero and grandson of Al Pratt.
 Cyclone / Maxine Hunkel — A wind-manipulating superhero and granddaughter of Ma Hunkel.
 Damage / Grant Emerson — A superhero that can perform a power charge that improves his abilities.
 Doctor Fate / Kent Nelson — The magical member of the Justice Society of America.
 Doctor Mid-Nite / Beth Chapel — A medical superhero who uses special goggles to see in the dark after losing her sight. Following the fight against Black Adam's group and the foreign superheroes, Doctor Mid-Nite is mentioned to have opened a metahuman medical clinic called the All-Star Clinic where Ronnie Raymond is receiving treatment.
 Flash / Jay Garrick — The speedster member of the Justice Society of America.
 Hawkman / Carter Hall — A member of the Justice Society of America and member of the Justice league.
 Hourman / Rex Tyler — A member of the Justice Society of America who uses Miraclo to get superpowers for one hour.
 Hourman / Rick Tyler — The son of Rex Tyler who became the second Hourman.
 Jade / Jennifer-Lynn Hayden — A Starheart-wielding superhero who is the daughter of Alan Scott and the twin sister of Obsidian.
 Jakeem Thunder — An African-American boy who is the current owner of Johnny Thunderbolt.
 Jonathan "Johnny" Thunder — A former member of the Justice Society of America who lives in a retirement home and is the only one to remember the Justice Society. Johnny later escapes in order to find Alan Scott's Power Battery where he is ambushed by a gang of thugs until he is saved by Rorschach II and Saturn Girl. Johnny and Irma were on the Owlship when Ozymandias began his plan. When it failed, Ozymandias met Irma and Johnny stating that he can save everyone. He previously worked on the set of Colman's last film. Johnny and Irma are shown to be held captive by Ozymandias. When Irma fades upon no longer being part of the current timeline, Ozymandias leaves as Johnny Thunder mourns Saturn Girl's disappearance. Alan Scott's Green Lantern is shown near him. When Doctor Manhattan undoes the experiment that erased the Justice Society of America and the Legion of Super-Heroes, Johnny finds himself merged with Thunderbolt and partnered up with Jakeem Thunder. Johnny Thunderbolt manages to take down Black Adam.
 Thunderbolt / Yz — A jinn from the Fifth Dimension who used to be John's partner, but disappeared after Joseph McCarthy had Johnny reveal his secret identity. When Doctor Manhattan undoes the experiment that erased the Justice Society of America and the Legion of Super-Heroes, Thunderbolt was merged with Johnny Thunder where this hybrid is partnered with Jakeem Thunder.
 Liberty Belle / Jesse Chambers — A superhero with super-speed.
 Mister Terrific / Michael Holt — A superhero with genius-level intellect who can make use of his T-Spheres.
 Obsidian / Todd Rice — A superhero who can merge his body with his own shadow. He is the son of Alan Scott and the twin brother of Jade.
 Power Girl / Kara Zor-El / Karen Starr — A variation of Supergirl.
 Sandman / Sanderson Hawkins — A superhero with a silicon-based body and the former sidekick of the original Sandman.
 Sandman / Wesley Dodds — A member of the Justice Society of America.
 Stargirl / Courtney Whitmore — A superhero who uses the equipment that formerly belonged to the Star-Spangled Kid. She later appeared with the Justice Society of America when they return to existence.
 S.T.R.I.P.E. / Patrick Dugan — The stepfather of Stargirl who pilots a large powered armor.
 Spectre / James Corrigan - A member of the Justice Society of America.
 Wildcat / Ted Grant — A boxing cat-themed member of the Justice Society of America. He was present at Jack Johnson's third wedding.
 Wildcat / Yolanda Montez — A cat-themed member of the Justice Society of America and the goddaughter of Ted Grant.

Knights Inc.
Knights Inc is the United Kingdom's sanctioned superhero team. Among its identified members are:

 Knight — Leader of Knights Inc.
 Beaumont — Member of Knights Inc.
 Canterbury Cricket — Member of Knights Inc.
 Crusader — Member of Knights Inc.
 Godiva — Member of Knights Inc.
 Golden Pharaoh — Member of Knights Inc.
 Hood — Member of Knights Inc.
 Jack O'Lantern — Member of Knights Inc.
 Lionheart — Member of Knights Inc.
 Looking Glass — Member of Knights Inc.
 Mistress Hyde — Member of Knights Inc.
 Ridge — Member of Knights Inc.
 Silent Knight — Member of Knights Inc.
 Squire — Member of Knights Inc.
 Templar — Member of Knights Inc.

League of Villainy
The League of Villainy was a gathering of villains who met to discuss the Superman Theory in an abandoned subway tunnel. The group was discovered by Comedian who crashed the meeting. Besides the Court of Owls and the Rogues, among the villains at this gathering are:

 Riddler / Edward Nigma — A member of the League of Villainy who organized it.
 Bane — He was mentioned to have been picked up by the FBI when en route to the League of Villainy meeting.
 Black Bison / Black-Cloud-in-Morning — A member of the League of Villainy.
 Black Mask / Roman Sionis — A member of the League of Villainy.
 Doctor Poison / Marina Maru — A member of the League of Villainy. She was the one who mentioned the rumor about Wonder Woman being forcefully dragged back to Themyscira.
 Doctor Psycho / Edgar Cizko — A member of the League of Villainy.
 Hector Hammond — A member of the League of Villainy.
 Mad Hatter / Jervis Tetch — A member of the League of Villainy.
 Mr. Freeze / Victor Fries — An inmate inside Arkham Asylum. He later joins the League of Villainy.
 Penguin / Oswald Cobblepot — A member of the League of Villainy.
 Professor Pyg / Lazlo Valentin — A member of the League of Villainy.
 Sonar / Bito Wladon — A member of the League of Villainy. He mentioned that all of Green Lantern's alien enemies are not on Earth.
 Tattooed Man / Abel Tarrant — A member of the League of Villainy. He states that Sanctuary "screwed up" his successor.
 Thaddeus Sivana — A member of the League of Villainy.
 Two-Face / Harvey Dent — A member of the League of Villainy.

Legion of Super-Heroes

The Legion of Super-Heroes are a superhero group that exist in the 31st Century. When Doctor Manhattan undid the experiment that resulted in the Legion of Super-Heroes and the Justice Society of America being erased, the Legion appeared to help Superman fight the rampaging metahumans.

Among its identified members are:

 Blok — A Dryad and member of the Legion of Super-Heroes who can absorb energy.
 Bouncing Boy — A member of the Legion of Super-Heroes with an inflatable body.
 Brainiac 5 — A Coluan and member of the Legion of Super-Heroes.
 Chameleon Boy — A shapeshifting Durlan and member of the Legion of Super-Heroes.
 Colossal Boy — A size-shifting member of the Legion of Super-Heroes.
 Cosmic Boy / Rokk Krinn — A founding member of the Legion of Super-Heroes with magnetic abilities.
 Element Lad — A Tromite and member of the Legion of Super-Heroes who can transmute any elements.
 Ferro Lad — A member of the Legion of Super-Heroes who can turn into iron. His Legion ring appeared before Doctor Manhattan with blood still on it. Due to Doctor Manhattan altering Alan Scott's fate, the Legion ring disappeared and Doctor Manhattan noticed its blood still on his hand.
 Lighting Lad / Garth Ranzz — A Winathian and founding member of the Legion of Super-Heroes with electrical abilities.
 Mon-El — A Daxamite and member of the Legion of Super-Heroes with powers similar to the Kryptonians.
 R.J. Brande — The Durlan benefactor of the Legion of Super-Heroes.
 Saturn Girl / Imra Ardeen — A telepathic founding member of the Legion of Super-Heroes. She appeared as an inmate inside Arkham Asylum designed as "Jane Doe". Saturn Girl had previously survived the Zero Hour event that was caused by Hal Jordan's Parallax form. She later helps Rorschach II escape from Arkham and they later met John Thunder. Johnny and Irma were on the Owlship when Ozymandias began his plan. When it failed, Ozymandias met Irma and Johnny stating that he can save everyone. Imra and Johnny are shown to be held captive by Ozymandias. Irma fades upon her future being changed. She was restored when Doctor Manhattan undid the experiment that erased the Justice Society of America and the Legion of Super-Heroes.
 Shadow Lass — A member of the Legion of Super-Heroes who can conjure absolute darkness within a radius around her.
 Star Boy / Thom Kallor — A member of the Legion of Super-Heroes who can increase the mass, density, or gravity of an object.
 Sun Boy — A member of the Legion of Super-Heroes who can generate heat and light.
 Timber Wolf — A member of the Legion of Super-Heroes who possesses claws, enhanced senses, the ability to heal quickly from injuries, and superhuman strength.
 Triplicate Girl / Luornu Durgo — A Carggite and member of the Legion of Super-Heroes who can split into three different bodies.
 Ultra Boy — A member of the Legion of Super-Heroes who can use a different power at a time.
 Wildfire — A member of the Legion of Super-Heroes who is composed of thermonuclear energy.

LexCorp

 Alexander Luthor — The CEO of LexCorp and Superman's nemesis who works with Lois to uncover the truth behind the Superman Theory. He was previously approached by Ozymandias with an offer to find Doctor Manhattan, but their meeting was interrupted by the Comedian. Lex Luthor later visited Lois Lane where he revealed himself as the one who gave Lois the flash-drive containing the footage of the Justice Society and that he suspects that Wally West holds the answers about Doctor Manhattan's manipulations. As payback for his previous injuries, Luthor uses a device to send the Comedian back to the moment of his death.
 Mercy Graves — Luthor's personal assistant in LexCorp.

Metal Men

The Metal Men are a group of robots. They are among the superheroes that head to Mars to confront Doctor Manhattan. The Metal men consist of:

 Gold — Leader of the Metal Men.
 Lead — The slow-witted member of the Metal Men.
 Iron — The strongest member of the Metal Men.
 Mercury — The hot-headed member of the Metal Men.
 Platinum — The female member of the Metal Men.
 Tin — The insecure member of the Metal Men.

New Gods

The New Gods are a group of beings that live on either New Genesis or Apokolips. Among the known New Gods are:

 Big Barda / Barda Free — A New Goddess from New Genesis and the wife of Mister Miracle and member of the Justice league. She is among the superheroes that head to Mars to confront Doctor Manhattan.
 Darkseid / Uxas — A New God who rules Apokolips. He was shown in Guy Gardner's construct that Doctor Manhattan reviews.
 Mister Miracle / Scott Free — A New God from New Genesis and the husband of Big Barda and member of the Justice league. He is among the superheroes that head to Mars to confront Doctor Manhattan.

Outsiders

The Outsiders have become Markovia's sanctioned superhero team. Among its identified members are:

 Geo-Force / Brion Markov — Prince of Markovia and leader of the Outsiders' Markovian branch.
 Baroness Bedlam — Member of the Outsiders' Markovian branch.
 Knightfall — Member of the Outsiders' Markovian branch.
 Terra — Member of the Outsiders' Markovian branch.
 Wylde — Member of the Outsiders' Markovian branch.

There is also a faction of the Outsiders that were previously established by Batman:

 Black Lightning / Jefferson Pierce — He joins Batman's incarnation of the Outsiders in confronting Doctor Manhattan.
 Halo / Gabrielle Doe — Member of Batman's incarnation of the Outsiders. She joins them in confronting Doctor Manhattan.
 Katana / Tatsu Yamashiro - Member of Batman's incarnation of the Outsiders.
 Metamorpho / Rex Mason — Former member of the Department of Metahuman Affairs. He is one of the people who expose the Superman Theory. He later joined Batman's incarnation of the Outsiders when they went to confront Doctor Manhattan.

People's Heroes
The People's Heroes are Russia's sanctioned superhero team. Among its identified members are:

 Pozhar / Mikhail Arkadin — A metahuman with powers similar to Firestorm. He is recruited by Vladimir Putin to lead the People's Heroes. He and the rest of the People's Heroes fought Firestorm when he lost control of his powers because of Doctor Manhattan causing Superman to intervene. Pozhar later tries to attack Doctor Manhattan only to be stopped by Superman.
 Black Eagle — A member of the People's Heroes.
 Firebird / Serafina Arkadin —
 Lady Flash / Ivana Molotova — A speedster who joined the People's Heroes.
 Morozko / Igor Medviedenko —
 Negative Woman / Valentina Vostok — Former member of the Doom Patrol and current member of the People's Heroes.
 Perun / Ilya Trepliov —
 Red Star / Leonid Kovar — A member of the People's Heroes.
 Rusalka - 
 Steel Wolf / Ivan Illyich Gort —
 Tundra — An ice-generating supe-strong heroine.
 Vikhor -
 Vostok-X II — A member of the People's Heroes who wears an Atlantean helmet and a jetpack.

Rogues

The Rogues are a group of villains from Central City and enemies of Flash who join the League of Villainy.

 Captain Cold / Leonard Snart — Leader of the Rogues who joins the League of Villainy.
 Captain Boomerang / George Harkness — Former member of the Suicide Squad who joins the League of Villainy. He was the only one to survive Black Adam's attack on the Suicide Squad.
 Heat Wave / Mick Rory — A member of the League of Villainy.
 Mirror Master / Samuel Scuddler — A member of the League of Villainy. When Comedian crashed the meeting, Mirror Master evacuated the Rogues from the subway tunnel.
 Top / Roscoe Dillon — A member of the League of Villainy.

Shazam's team

Billy Batson and his foster siblings associated with the wizard Shazam.

 Shazam / William Batson — A boy chosen by the wizard Shazam to share his powers and Member of the Justice League. The character was introduced during the Golden Age of Comics by Fawcett Comics.
 Pedro Peña — Member of the Shazam Family with super-strength.
 Mary Bromfield — Sister of Shazam and member of the Shazam Family.
  Eugene Choi — Member of the Shazam Family who has technopathic abilities.
 Freddy Freeman — Member of the Shazam Family.
 Darla Dudley — Member of the Shazam Family with super-speed.

Sinestro Corps

The Sinestro Corps are enemies of the Green Lantern Corps.

 Sinestro — Leader of the Sinestro Corps. He was shown in Guy Gardner's construct that Doctor Manhattan reviews.

Sleeping Soldiers
The Sleeping Soldiers are Australia's sanctioned superhero team. Among its identified members are:

 Dreamer — Leader of the Sleeping Soldiers.
 Argonaut — Member of the Sleeping Soldiers.
 Dark Ranger — Member of the Sleeping Soldiers.
 Miss Midnight — Member of the Sleeping Soldiers.
 Tasmanian Devil — A Tasmanian devil-themed superhero and member of the Sleeping Soldiers.
 Umbaluru — Member of the Sleeping Soldiers.

Suicide Squad

The Suicide Squad are a group of prisoners that work for A.R.G.U.S. where they do missions for the United States government in exchange for suspended sentences. Captain Boomerang mentioned that most of the Suicide Squad members were defeated by Black Adam in their mission to Kahndaq.

 Amanda Waller — The superior of the Suicide Squad and director of A.R.G.U.S.
 Harley Quinn / Harleen Quinzel — Frenemy of Batman and ex-associate of Joker. She appears in a photograph inside Joker's funhouse.

Super-Family
Relatives and friends of Superman.

 Superman / Kal-El / Clark Kent — A survivor of Krypton and superhero of Metropolis and Founding Member of the Justice League. He was initially the only superhero wanted in the world during the Metahuman Arms Race, but his status was dismissed after attempting to interfere in Russia's misleading incident with Firestorm. The explosion caused by Bubastis II placed him and Batman in a coma as Lois stays by his side. Doctor Manhattan analyzes Superman's history that also includes his Earth-One, Earth-Two and New Earth counterparts. By the time Manhattan arrives on Earth, Superman wakes up from his coma in desperation. After stopping Pozhar from attacking Doctor Manhattan, Superman persuades him to undo his experiments in the past. Doctor Manhattan also foresees some later events that Superman will be involved in
 Clara Kent — A descendant of Superman in the year 2045.
 Colin Kent — A descendant of Superman in the year 2038
 Lana Lang — Former love interest of Superman. He appeared in a nightmare of Superman's.
 Lois Lane — Superman's wife who works with Luthor to uncover the truth behind the Superman Theory, whom she originally suspected. When Superman unsuccessfully attempts to prevent Firestorm's incident in Russia, Lois stood by his comatose body at the Hall of Justice. She receives a visit from Luthor, explaining that he sent the USB drive containing information about the Justice Society of America while also mentioning that Wally West might hold the key behind Manhattan's manipulations.
 Jonathan and Martha Kent — Superman's adoptive parents who died in a car crash. When Doctor Manhattan undid the experiment that erased the Justice Society of America and the Legion of Super-Heroes, their deaths were prevented by a younger Clark Kent.
 Pete Ross — Former childhood friend of Superman. He appeared in a nightmare of Superman's.
 Sam Lane — A U. S. Army General who is the father of Lois, and father-in-law of Superman whom he despised from the sole reason of being an alien. He is seen pulling his troops out of Qurac. He then admits his personal involvement in the Supermen Theory.
 Steel / John Henry Irons — An armored superhero and ally of Superman.
 Superboy / Jonathan Samuel Kent — The son of Superman and Lois Lane. He was mentioned by Lois during an argument with Perry White.
 Supergirl / Kara Zor-El / Kara Danvers — The cousin of Superman.

Team Flash
 Flash / Bartholomew Allen — The secondFlash and Central City's superhero. He is among the superheroes that confronted Doctor Manhattan on Mars and member of the Justice League.
 Flash / Wallace West — Barry Allen's nephew, as well as the first Kid Flash, and later the third Flash. He is the one who suspected Doctor Manhattan modified reality after the Flashpoint event. Wally was the unintentional killer behind the Sanctuary massacre after his Speed Force gets out of control and was detained by the Justice League. Lex Luthor suspected that he holds the answers about Manhattan's manipulations when he brings it up to Lois Lane.
 Iris West II — A manifestation of Wally West's fear of not being able to see his family again that was born in the Dark Multiverse. She is the twin sister of Jai West and was emigrated to Earth 0 by Wally West. Doctor Manhattan's vision of a possible future says that Iris West II will become the latest Kid Flash.
 Turtle / Jai West — A manifestation of Wally West's fear of not being able to see his family again that was born in the Dark Multiverse. He is the twin brother of Iris West II and was emigrated to Earth 0. Doctor Manhattan's vision of a possible future says that Jai will become a superhero called Turtle.

Teen Titans

The Teen Titans are a group of young superheroes. Among its identified members are:

 Donna Troy — Member of the Titans.
 Starfire / Koriand'r — A Tamaranian member of the Teen Titans and the Justice League Odyssey.

Other characters
 Albert and Karl Verner — Two brothers and film producers who used to work with Carver Colman in most of their films.
 Alpha Centurion / Roman — He is among the superheroes that confronted Doctor Manhattan on Mars.
 Animal Man / Bernhard Baker — He is among the superheroes that confronted Doctor Manhattan on Mars.
 Anti-Monitor / Mobius — A resident from Qward in the Antimatter Universe and responsible for the "Crisis on Infinite Earths." He was shown in Guy Gardner's construct that Doctor Manhattan reviews.
 Atom / Ray Palmer — He is among the superheroes that confronted Doctor Manhattan on Mars.
 Atomic Knight / Gardner Grayle — He is among the superheroes that confronted Doctor Manhattan on Mars.
 Batman Who Laughs / Bruce Wayne — An evil counterpart of Batman from Earth -22 in the Dark Multiverse who was exposed to Joker venom and went mad. He commanded the Dark Knights under the guidance of Barbatos. The Batman Who Laughs was shown in Guy Gardner's construct that Doctor Manhattan reviews.
 Blue Devil / Daniel Cassidy — He is among the superheroes that confronted Doctor Manhattan on Mars.
 Booster Gold / Michael Jon Carter — He is among the superheroes that confronted Doctor Manhattan on Mars.
 Brainiac / Vril Dox — Another of Superman's enemies. He was shown in Guy Gardner's construct that Doctor Manhattan reviews.
 Bruce Nelson — A detective of the San Francisco Police Department who previously investigated the murder of Carver Colman. The character was introduced during the Earth-Two era.
 Bumblebee / Karen Beecher — She is among the superheroes that confronted Doctor Manhattan on Mars.
 Captain Atom / Nathaniel Adam — He is the basis of Doctor Manhattan. Captain Atom is among the superheroes that confront Doctor Manhattan on Mars.
 Carver Colman — A noir film actor who portrayed the character "Nathaniel Dusk". The character was introduced during the Earth-Two era. During the premiere of his last film, Colman was bludgeoned to death with an award he won. His murder started an investigation which revealed that Colman claimed to be the son of Irish immigrants and being raised on Merrillville, Indiana, but many doubts emerged after the San Francisco police discovered his true location on Beverly Hills, California. Several documents showed Colman was blackmailed by his real mother Charlotte, who conceived him with a member of the Sabella crime family, but kicked Carver out after discovering he was gay. According to Doctor Manhattan, Carver was once "full of hope" before he died. The truth was Charlotte killed Carver after her failed blackmailing, and made it look like a robbery; among the evidence of Carver's death, there was a letter from Charlotte, which was later burnt by his cleaning maid to protect his secrets and prevent his acting career from being ruined. When visited by Doctor Manhattan, Carver's fate was prevented and comes out to the public, preventing his death. Carver becoming an advocate for social activism and homosexuality, dying in 2005 with his partner of 40 years at his side.
 Charlotte Colman — Carver's single mother and former exotic dancer. She killed her own son after failing to blackmail him. This was later prevented by Doctor Manhattan.
 Despero — He was shown in a hologram that Doctor Manhattan reviews.
 Doomsday — He was shown in Guy Gardner's construct that Doctor Manhattan reviews.
 Dove / Dawn Granger — Hawk's partner who gets arrested in Russia.
 Elongated Man / Randolph Dibny — He is among the superheroes that confronted Doctor Manhattan.
 Firehawk (Theresa) — She is among the superheroes that confronted Doctor Manhattan on Mars.
 Frank Farr — Father of Elasti-Girl, who was conceived when he was having an affair during his first marriage.
 Franklin Rock — He was mentioned by Jack Johnson during his third wedding when he requested a moment of silence to honor him.
 Hawk / Extant / Hank Hall — Dove's partner who gets arrested in Russia. His Extant form was also a conspirator during the Zero Hour event.
 Huntress — She appears in Doctor Manhattan's vision of Earth-Two.
 Jack Johnson — A war veteran who was celebrating his third marriage. He was also a friend and comrade of Franklin Rock as he requested a moment of silence to honor him.
 John Law — A screenwriter who was originally suspected for Carver Colman's murder, but was later released because he was on Santa Monica Boulevard. The character was introduced during the Quality Comics era.
 Joker — Batman's nemesis who takes an interest in Mime and Marionette. When Batman used Metron's Mobius Chair to know the Joker's true name, the Chair revealed that "there are three."
 Joseph Morgan — Former trainer of Wildcat. The character was introduced during the Earth-Two era.
 Nightshade (Eve Eden) — She is the basis of Silk Spectre.
 Red Tornado — He is among the superheroes that confronted Doctor Manhattan on Mars and member of the justice league.
 Robert Reed — In the form of Human Starfish, he is among the superheroes that head to Mars to confront Doctor Manhattan.
 Sandra Stanyon — The ex-wife of Jonathan Lord.
 Superboy-Prime / Kal-El / Clark Kent — A resident from Earth 33 and conspirator during the Infinite Crisis. He was shown in Guy Gardner's construct that Doctor Manhattan reviews.
 Tin Soldier / Randy Booth — An actor who interrupted Jack Johnson's third wedding.

Guest characters
The following characters appearing in this version are from real life.

 Alicia Malone - 
 Bryce DeWitt — A scientist who proposed the many-worlds interpretation.
 Donald Trump — President of the United States during present day in the DC Universe. He is later mentioned to be undergoing impeachment.
 Fred Coe - A TV producer and director.
 Gary Cooper — An actor who worked with Carver Colman during his last film.
 Hedy Lamarr — An actress who worked with Carver Colman during his last film.
 John Hinckley Jr. — A homeless man who attempted to assassinate Ronald Reagan in order to impress Jodie Foster. In the Watchmen universe, he successfully did it.
 Jonathan Lord - A British politician.
 Otto Preminger — A film producer who worked with Carver Colman during his last film.
 Richard Nixon — President of the United States during 1985 in the Watchmen universe.
 Robert Redford — President of the United States during 1992 in the Watchmen universe.
 Ronald Reagan — President of the United States between 1981 and 1989. In the Watchmen universe, he was successfully assassinated by John Hinckley Jr.
 Vladimir Putin — President of Russia during present day in the DC Universe; he was the one who established the People's Heroes.
 William F. Buckley Jr. — In the Watchmen universe, he publicly announced nuclear warfare because of the exposure of Ozymandias' massacre.

See also
 List of DC Comics characters
 List of Watchmen characters

Notes

References

Doomsday Clock characters
Watchmen characters